The 1974 Campeonato Ecuatoriano de Fútbol de la Serie A was the 16th national championship for football teams in Ecuador. LDU Quito won their second national title.

Teams
Eight teams started the season. Two would be relegated mid-season and be replaced by two teams from the Serie B. The following eight teams started the season (home city in parentheses):

Barcelona (Guayaquil)
Deportivo Cuenca (Cuenca)
Deportivo Quito (Quito)
El Nacional (Quito)
Emelec (Guayaquil)
LDU Portoviejo (Portoviejo)
Macará (Ambato)
Universidad Católica (Quito)

First stage

Second stage
Two teams were promoted from the Serie B after the First Stage; there was no relegation after this stage. The new teams are (home city in parentheses):
América (Quito)
LDU Quito (Quito)

Liguilla
The following teams qualified to for the Liguilla:
Deportivo Cuenca
El Nacional
LDU Quito

Since El Nacional accumulated the most points during the season, they advanced automatically to the finals.

References
General

External links
Official website 

1974
Ecu
Football